HH was the last of the letters assigned to original routes of the Independent Subway System of the New York City Subway in the 1930s.  It was designated as the dedicated service letter of the IND Fulton Street Line in Brooklyn.

The letter was intended to be used for a service running local from Court Street, a stub-end station in Downtown Brooklyn, to the future Euclid Avenue station near the border with Queens. Express service on the four-track line was to be provided by trains coming from Jay Street–Borough Hall and Manhattan.

History 
When service on the Fulton Street Line began on April 9, 1936, all trains serving it ran into Manhattan and the HH ran only as a two-stop shuttle to connect Court Street with Hoyt–Schermerhorn Streets. The HH ran on weekdays and Saturday from 7 a.m. to 7 p.m. At that latter station, it stopped at the outermost tracks and platforms and connections to the Fulton Street and Crosstown trains were available.

Since the two stations the HH served were just three blocks apart in distance, it was discontinued on June 1, 1946 at 7 p.m. Since then, the two outermost tracks at Hoyt–Schermerhorn Streets have not been used in revenue service.

The Court Street station is now the site of the New York Transit Museum. The tracks leading to the station from the IND Fulton Street Line are still operable and used to move trains to and from the exhibit.

Route

References

External links
 Line By Line History
 Court St, and Hoyt-Schermerhorns Sts platforms

Defunct New York City Subway services